Nahra is a village in Batala in Gurdaspur district of Punjab State, India.It is located  from sub district headquarter,  from district headquarter and  from Sri Hargobindpur. The village is administrated by Sarpanch an elected representative of the village.

Demography 
, The village has a total number of 22 houses and the population of 131 of which 69 are males while 62 are females.  According to the report published by Census India in 2011, out of the total population of the village 0 people are from Schedule Caste and the village does not have any Schedule Tribe population so far.

See also
List of villages in India

References

External links 
 Tourism of Punjab
 Census of Punjab

Villages in Gurdaspur district